Daniel Taradash (January 29, 1913 – February 22, 2003) was an American screenwriter.

Taradash's credits include Golden Boy (1939), From Here to Eternity (1952), Rancho Notorious (1952), Don't Bother to Knock (1952), Désirée (1954), Picnic (1955), Storm Center (1956), which he also directed, Bell, Book and Candle (1958), Morituri (1965), Hawaii (1966), Castle Keep (1969),  Doctors' Wives (1971), and Bogie (1980), a film biography of Humphrey Bogart.

Early years
Daniel Taradash was born to a Jewish family in Kentucky and raised in Chicago and Miami Beach. He attended Harvard University, where he met his future producing partner Jules Blaustein. He graduated with a law degree and passed the New York State bar. But when his play The Mercy won the 1938 Bureau of New Plays contest (the two previous winners were Arthur Miller and Tennessee Williams), a career in theater was launched. He moved to Hollywood, where he worked as a scripter. His first assignment was as one of four credited writers on the screen version of Clifford Odets' Golden Boy (1939).

His theater career was interrupted when, during World War II, Taradash served in the U.S. Army and eventually underwent training in the Signal Corps Officer Candidate program. He was assigned to the Signal Corps Photo Center and worked as a writer and producer of training films.

Post World War II career
After the war, Taradash attempted to find success on Broadway with an American version of Jean-Paul Sartre's Red Gloves, but the show folded quickly and he returned to Hollywood. He had more success as the co-writer (with John Monks Jr) of the Humphrey Bogart vehicle Knock on Any Door (1949). The Fritz Lang Western Rancho Notorious and the psychodrama Don't Bother to Knock (both 1952). Performers included Marlene Dietrich and Arthur Kennedy in the former, Richard Widmark and Marilyn Monroe in the latter. His adaptation of James Jones' massive novel From Here to Eternity (1953) starring Burt Lancaster was a big success and earned Taradash an Oscar. It was directed by Fred Zinnemann. His subsequent film work was generally in adaptations, including Desiree (1954), about Napoleon and Joséphine, Picnic (1955), from the William Inge play, and Bell, Book and Candle (1958), from John Van Druten's stage comedy.

In the mid-1950s, Taradash and Jules Blaustein formed Phoenix Corporation. He also tried his hand at directing with Storm Center (1956) starring Bette Davis as a librarian fighting censorship and book banning. Taradash and Zinnemann had planned to make two films from James Michener's massive novel Hawaii but were unable to raise the financing. (When George Roy Hill did make the film in 1965, he utilized Taradash's script with emendations by Dalton Trumbo.) By the 1970s, Taradash's efforts produced his final two scripts for the soap operas Doctors' Wives (1971) and The Other Side of Midnight (1977).

Taradash won the Oscar for Best Adapted Screenplay and the Writers Guild of America Award for Best Written American Drama for From Here to Eternity, and received a WGA nomination for Picnic.

Taradash served as president of the Academy of Motion Picture Arts and Sciences from 1970 to 1973. He was AMPAS's 20th president. In 1972 he introduced Charlie Chaplin at Chaplin's legendary appearance at the 44th Academy Awards and presented him with an honorary award.

In 2003, Taradash died of pancreatic cancer in Los Angeles at age 90.

Achievements
 1938 - Passed New York bar exam
 1938 - Won the Bureau of New Plays nationwide playwrighting contest previously won by Arthur Miller and Tennessee Williams
 1939 - First feature credit as one of four credited screenwriters on the film adaptation of Golden Boy
 1941 - Served in the US Army
 1948 - Debut as a Broadway playwright, Red Gloves, adapted from the work by Jean-Paul Sartre
 1949 - Breakthrough screen credit as co-writer of Knock on Any Door
 1953 - Earned Academy Award for his screenplay for From Here to Eternity, adapted from the James Jones novel
 1956 - Adapted William Inge's Picnic
 1956 - Directorial debut, Storm Center (also wrote)
 1958 - Wrote the screenplay adaptation of Bell, Book and Candle
 1959 - Made one-shot return to Broadway as playwright of There Was a Little Girl, starring Jane Fonda
 1966 - Received co-writer credit on Hawaii; originally he and director Fred Zinnemann had hoped to make two films based on the James Michener novel but financing could not be raised
 1971 - Scripted Doctors Wives
 1977 - Final screenplay credit, The Other Side of Midnight
 1996 - Laurel Award for Screenwriting Achievement

Sources

External links

1913 births
2003 deaths
Harvard Law School alumni
Deaths from pancreatic cancer
Best Adapted Screenplay Academy Award winners
Presidents of the Academy of Motion Picture Arts and Sciences
American male screenwriters
Jewish American screenwriters
Deaths from cancer in California
Writers from Louisville, Kentucky
Screenwriters from Kentucky
20th-century American male writers
20th-century American screenwriters
20th-century American Jews
21st-century American Jews